Bodney is a village and former civil parish, now in the parish of Hilborough, in the Breckland district, in the county of Norfolk, England. In 1931 the parish had a population of 70.

History
Bodney is an Anglo-Saxon name meaning 'Beoda's island' which suggests that at one time the settlement was completely surrounded by marshland.

In the Domesday Book, Bodney was recorded as consisting of 19 households owned by William of Warenne, Ralph of Tosny and Hugh de Montfort.

At the Dissolution of the Monasteries it became Crown property and was granted to the Duke of Norfolk. On 1 April 1935 the parish was abolished and merged with Hilborough.

During the Second World War, warplanes operated from RAF Bodney. From 1940 to 1943, the airfield was used by the Bristol Blenheims of No. 21 and No. 82 Squadron and, subsequently, from 1943 to 1945 by the 149th, 486th and 487th Fighter Squadrons of the United States Army Air Forces.

St. Mary's Church
St. Mary's is located on the side of the B1108 and is built in Norman style. The church was significantly remodelled in the 19th Century and is bordered on its far side by Stanford Battle Area.

Notes

External links

Villages in Norfolk
Former civil parishes in Norfolk
Breckland District